Mineral de la Reforma is one of the 84 municipalities of Hidalgo, in central-eastern Mexico. Adjacent to Pachuca in the same built up area, it is one of the fastest-growing cities of Hidalgo State. As of 2005, the municipality had a total population of 68,704.

Its population is estimated at 89,509 inhabitants in 2009 (Coplaco). The municipal seat lies at Pachuquilla.  The municipality covers an area of 106 km².

Population
According to the general census of population and housing in 2010 by INEGI Mineral de la Reforma, it is considered the third largest city in the state of Hidalgo, registering 127.404 inhabitants, with an annual average growth of 11.2%.

References

Municipalities of Hidalgo (state)